Schinia suetus is a moth of the family Noctuidae first described by Augustus Radcliffe Grote in 1873. It is widespread in the mountains of western North America, from southern Alberta west to British Columbia, south at least to Colorado and California, east to Idaho and New Mexico.

The wingspan is about 25 mm. Adults are on wing from June to July depending on the location.

The larvae feed on Lupinus.

Subspecies
Schinia suetus suetus
Schinia suetus californica
Schinia suetus martini
Schinia suetus sierrae

References

Schinia
Moths of North America
Moths described in 1873